Tiansheng may refer to:

Tiansheng, Sichuan (天生镇), a town in Xuanhan County, Sichuan, China
Tiansheng Subdistrict (天生街道), Beibei District, Chongqing, China

Historical eras
 Tiansheng (天聖; 1023–1032), era name used by Emperor Renzong of Song
 Tiansheng (天盛; 1149–1170), era name used by Emperor Renzong of Western Xia

See also
 List of Chinese eras